NGC 5907 (also known as Knife Edge Galaxy or Splinter Galaxy) is a spiral galaxy located approximately 50 million light years from Earth. It has an anomalously low metallicity and few detectable giant stars, being apparently composed almost entirely of dwarf stars. It is a member of the NGC 5866 Group.

NGC 5907 has long been considered a prototypical example of a warped spiral in relative isolation. In 2006, an international team of astronomers announced the presence of an extended tidal stream surrounding the galaxy that challenges this picture and suggests the gravitational perturbations induced by the stream progenitor may be the cause for the warp.
The existence of part of these tidal streams has been recently challenged by some deeper surveys.

The galaxy was discovered in 1788 by William Herschel. Supernova 1940A was in this galaxy.

An ultraluminous X-ray source is located in the galaxy.

Location

The edge-on galaxy is seen in the constellation Draco, near the star iota Draconis. It is seen in the sky near to the much more distant galaxy NGC 5965.

NGC Identification 

NGC 5907 is also known as NGC 5906. This second NGC number refers to a fainter part of the galaxy lying west of the dust lane that was recorded by astronomer and physicist George Johnstone Stoney on April 13, 1850.

Gallery

References

External links

 Ghost of a Dwarf Galaxy (Fossils of the Hierarchical Formation of the Nearby Spiral Galaxy NGC 5907)
 Astronomy Picture of the Day: NGC 5907 (2008 June 19 )
 Fossils of the Hierarchical Formation of the Nearby Spiral Galaxy NGC5907 (arXiv:0805.1137)
 SEDS – NGC 5907
 Hunting ghosts Hunting ghosts: the iconic stellar stream(s) around NGC 5907 under scrutiny

5907
Draco (constellation)
NGC 5866 Group
Astronomical objects discovered in 1788
054470
09801
Unbarred spiral galaxies